Cruoriella elegans is a species of red algae in the family Peyssonneliaceae. It is found in the southern islands of Japan.

References

External links 

 
 Cruoriella elegans at AlgaeBase

Species described in 1968
Peyssonneliales